Barisal guns or fog guns (mistpoeffers (fog dissipators) in Belgium and Netherlands, Seeschießen (sea/lake gunshots) in Germany, brontidi (thunder-like) or baturlio marinas in Italy) are a series of loud booms heard near the Barisal region of East Bengal (currently in Bangladesh) in the 19th century. There are various theories about the origin of the sound. One common explanation is that it was caused by the sound of waves, broken up by local topography, but geological origins have also been proposed. The sound is an example of a skyquake – an unexplained sudden loud sound without corresponding earthquake activity. Similar sounds have been reported in many waterfront communities around the world such as the Ganges Delta and Brahmaputra River delta in India, the East Coast and inland Finger Lakes of the United States, as well as areas of the North Sea, the lakes of southern Germany, Japan  and Italy; and sometimes away from water.

The unexplained source of the phenomenon has drawn mystical interpretations, for example in Theosophical writings.

References

Barishal District
Unidentified sounds